Bringing the Dark Past to Light: The Reception of the Holocaust in Postcommunist Europe (2013) is a collection of twenty essays about the reception of the Holocaust in history and memory in various post-Communist countries. There is a different essay on each country. The book received mostly favorable reviews.

References

2013 non-fiction books
Communism in Europe
Decommunization
History books about the Holocaust
Historiography of Europe